is a 2016 Japanese drama film directed by  and written by . It was released in Japan on January 9, 2016.

Plot

Cast
Yutaka Takenouchi
Yōsuke Eguchi
Tori Matsuzaka
Yūka
Eiko Koike
Hikaru Takahashi
Jun Miho
Mikako Ichikawa

Reception
The film grossed  on its opening weekend in Japan and was sixth placed in admissions, with 81,867. As of January 24, 2016, the film had grossed  in Japan.

References

External links
 

Japanese drama films
Nippon TV films
2016 drama films
2010s Japanese films